Albert Pratt may refer to:

Albert Pratt (cricketer) (1893–1916), New Zealand cricketer
Albert F. Pratt (1872–1928), American lawyer and politician, Attorneys General of Minnesota
Al Pratt (baseball) (1847–1937), American baseball player and manager
A. Miles Pratt (1885–1969), American politician, acting mayor of New Orleans